Asarotus is an extinct genus of prehistoric bony fish that lived during the Campanian.

References

Palaeonisciformes
Late Cretaceous fish
Late Cretaceous fish of North America
Prehistoric ray-finned fish genera